Alphonse Leroy may refer to:

 Alphonse Leroy (physician) (1742–1816), French doctor
 Alphonse Leroy (engraver) (1820–1902), French engraver and photographer